Mimosa or Becrux is the second-brightest object in the southern constellation of Crux (after Acrux), and the 20th-brightest star in the night sky. It has the Bayer designation β Crucis, which is Latinised to Beta Crucis and abbreviated Beta Cru or β Cru. Mimosa forms part of the prominent asterism called the Southern Cross. It is a binary star or a possible triple star system.

Nomenclature

β Crucis (Latinised to Beta Crucis) is the system's Bayer designation. Although Mimosa is at roughly −60° declination, and therefore not visible north of 30° latitude, in the time of the ancient Greeks and Romans it was visible north of 40° due to the precession of equinoxes, and these civilizations regarded it as part of the constellation of Centaurus.

It bore the traditional names Mimosa and the historical name Becrux . Mimosa, which is derived from the Latin for 'actor', may come from the flower of the same name. Becrux is a modern contraction of the Bayer designation. In 2016, the International Astronomical Union organized a Working Group on Star Names (WGSN) to catalog and standardize proper names for stars. The WGSN's first bulletin of July 2016 included a table of the first two batches of names approved by the WGSN; which included Mimosa for this star.

Stellar system

In 1957, German astronomer Wulff-Dieter Heintz discovered that it is a spectroscopic binary with components that are too close together to resolve with a telescope. The pair orbit each other every 5 years with an estimated separation that varies from 5.4 to 12.0 Astronomical Units. The system is only 8 to 11 million years old.

The primary, β Crucis A, is a massive star with about 16 times the Sun's mass. However, the orbital plane of the pair is only about 10°, which probably means the inclination of the star's pole is also likely to be low. With a radius of about 8.4 times the radius of the Sun, this would mean the star has a rotational period of only about 3.6 days.

β Crucis A is a known β Cephei variable, although with an effective temperature of about 27,000 K it is at the hot edge of the instability strip where such stars are found. It has three different pulsation modes, none of which are radial. The periods of all three modes are in the range of 4.03–4.59 hours. Owing to the first application of polarimetry it is the heaviest star with an age determined by asteroseismology. The star has a stellar classification of B0.5 III, with the luminosity class of 'III' indicating that this is a giant star that has exhausted the supply of hydrogen at its core. The high temperature of the star's outer envelope is what gives the star the blue-white hue that is characteristic of B-type stars. The wind is leaving the system with a velocity of 2,000 km s−1 or more.

The secondary, β Crucis B, may be a main sequence star with a stellar class of B2. In 2007, a third companion was announced, which may be a low mass, pre-main sequence star. The X-ray emission from this star was detected using the Chandra X-ray Observatory. Two other stars, located at angular separations of 44 and 370 arcseconds, are likely optical companions that are not physically associated with the system. The β Crucis system may be a member of the Lower Centaurus–Crux sub-group of the Scorpius–Centaurus association. This is a stellar association of stars that share a common origin.

In culture

Mimosa is represented in the flags of Australia, New Zealand, Samoa and Papua New Guinea as one of five stars making up the Southern Cross. It is also featured in the flag of Brazil, along with 26 other stars, each of which represents a state. Mimosa represents the State of Rio de Janeiro.

A vessel named MV Becrux is used to export live cattle from Australia to customers in Asia. An episode dedicated to the vessel features in the television documentary series Mighty Ships.

References

External links
 http://jumk.de/astronomie/big-stars/becrux.shtml

B-type main-sequence stars
B-type giants
Beta Cephei variables
Spectroscopic binaries
Lower Centaurus Crux

Crux (constellation)
Crucis, Beta
4843
Durchmusterung objects
111123
062434
Mimosa